Pietro Nelli (1672 – after 1730) was an Italian painter of the late-Baroque period.

He was born in Massa, where he had been a pupil of Giovanni Maria Morandi in Rome. He was known for his portraits including those of Cardinal Lodovico Pico (engraved by Frey); Andrea Giuseppe Rossi (engraved by Niccolo Billy); and Bishop Giovanni Francesco Tenderini (engraved by Giovanni Battista Rossi).

References

1670s births
17th-century Italian painters
Italian male painters
18th-century Italian painters
Italian Baroque painters
18th-century deaths
18th-century Italian male artists